Emma Hamilton (born November 13th 1984) is an Australian actress. On television, she currently appears as lead actress in RFDS (2021). She has also appeared as a series lead in the Nine Network drama thriller Hyde & Seek (2016), along with series regular roles as Anne Stanhope on the Showtime historical drama The Tudors (2009–2010), Rosie Dolly on the ITV/PBS period drama Mr Selfridge (2015) and in the ITV crime thriller Fearless (2017). Her film roles include the Australian drama Last Cab to Darwin (2015), which earned her an AACTA nomination for Best Actress in a Supporting Role.

Background
Hamilton trained at the Royal Academy of Dramatic Art.

Career
Hamilton made her television debut in the hit Showtime drama series The Tudors, portraying the sharp-tongued Anne Stanhope in seasons three and four. Her breakthrough role was in the highly acclaimed film Last Cab to Darwin in 2015, for which she was nominated for Best Supporting Actress at the AACTA Awards. She is known for her roles in Mr Selfridge, Hyde & Seek and Mary: The Making of a Princess.

Notable feature films include the black comedy Whole Lotta Sole with Brendan Fraser by Oscar-winning director Terry George, and the action thriller The Cold Light of Day where she starred alongside Bruce Willis and Henry Cavill.

Hamilton won her first professional role in HBO's World War II film Into the Storm, produced by Ridley Scott, upon graduating drama school. Subsequently, she made her stage debut as Isabella Thorpe in an adaptation of Jane Austen's Northanger Abbey at the Salisbury Playhouse in September 2007. Her first major stage role followed in 2008 in the Royal Exchange Theatre's production of Tennessee Williams' The Glass Menagerie where she played Laura Wingfield opposite Brenda Blethyn, her portrayal described as "a haunting, heartbreaking performance". In 2010 she performed alongside Gemma Arterton and Stephen Dillane in the off-West End production of Ibsen's The Master Builder. Hamilton's leading performance in the title role of Ibsen's Hedda Gabler at the Royal & Derngate Theatre in 2012 was critically acclaimed.

In 2013 Hamilton joined the Royal Shakespeare Company playing Queen Isabella opposite David Tennant in Richard II (play), Gregory Doran's first production as artistic director. Richard II broke records as the fastest selling production in RSC history and when screened live to cinemas around the UK on 13 November 2013, played to an audience of over 60,000.

Hamilton returned to international screens as Eleanor, the malevolent red-headed half-sister of Porthos in the BBC's The Musketeers. She then went on to star in the romantic comedy Mary: The Making of a Princess in the title role of Mary Donaldson, the future Crown Princess of Denmark. The television biopic was the highest rating drama for the network for that year, earning praise as "fun...tearjerking film-making." Hamilton physically transformed herself for the role, dying her hair brunette and wearing brown contact lenses. In that year Hamilton also featured as Rosie Dolly (one of the infamous Dolly sisters), the blonde American love interest of Mr Selfridge in the fourth season of the period drama starring Jeremy Piven. In 2016 she starred in her first major series television lead role as ex-NZSIS agent Claire McKenzie in the crime thriller Hyde & Seek.

Film

Television

Theatre

References

External links
 

1984 births
Living people
Actresses from Melbourne
Alumni of RADA
British film actresses
British television actresses
British stage actresses
Australian film actresses
Australian stage actresses
Australian television actresses
Australian emigrants to England